Rawalpindi Development Authority (RDA) (Urdu: راولپنڈی ڈویلپمنٹ اتھارٹی) is a government sector corporation and authority responsible for providing Municipal and Town Services in Rawalpindi City, a city in the Punjab, Pakistan. RDA was established in May 1989 to improve, enhance and implement the growth plan for Rawalpindi city.

History 
Rawalpindi Development Authority (RDA) was established in May 1989 under the Act of the Development of cities by the Punjab Government. In 1976, an autonomous governing body replaced Rawalpindi Improvement Trust (RIT) with Rawalpindi Development Authority (RDA). The Rawalpindi Development Authority started functioning in March 1992.

Vision 
Rawalpindi Development Authority seeks to be a public-friendly principal planning, development and improvements organization in Rawalpindi city, The aim of the Rawalpindi Development Authority (RDA) is facilitating and enabling provision and continuously improving metropolis-wide development works, facilities, services and incentives of acceptable and Modern World standards for Residential and Commercial outlets in Rawalpindi city.

Territory 
Rawalpindi Development Authority is spread over the Rawal Town and 64 other Revenue and Land Estates of Potohar Town, except Cantonment Board. The controlled area of Rawalpindi Development Authority is around 311 Sq. km.

Governing body 
The members of the Governing Body for the Rawalpindi Development Authority consist of the following.
 Finance Minister, Govt of the Punjab.
 Chairman P & D Board.
 Secretary of the Finance Department.
 Secretary of the LG and RD Department.
 Secretary of the HUD and PHE Department.
 Commissioner Rawalpindi
 Managing Director WASA Rawalpindi
 Mayor of the Rawalpindi
 District Coordination Officer

Directorates 
There are 4 directorates for the Rawalpindi Development Authority.
 Directorate of the Metropolitan and Traffic Engineering
 Directorate of the Land and Estate Management.
 Directorate of the Engineering.
 Directorate of the Administration and Finance.

Services 
There are the main and prominent incentives and services from Rawalpindi Development Authority.
 Building and used Land Control and Urban areas development plan.
 Launch new and state of the art housing slandered schemes.
 Preservation and improvement for the Green-friendly and public-friendly environment.
 Development of Estate and Land Management.

References 

Rawalpindi District
Urban development authorities
Government agencies of Punjab, Pakistan